The Main Attraction may refer to:

 The Main Attraction (film), a 1962 British drama film 
 The Main Attraction (album), a 1976 album by Grant Green, or the title song
 Main Attraction (album), a 1982 album by Suzi Quatro, or the title song
 "Main Attraction", a 2019 song by Jeremy Renner
 "Main Attraction", a song by Quiet Riot from QR III

See also
The Main Event (disambiguation)